Raylan Givens is a fictional character created by American novelist and screenwriter Elmore Leonard.

Givens is a Deputy U.S. Marshal and initially appeared in the novels Pronto and Riding the Rap. (Pronto was adapted as a TV movie in 1997 with James LeGros as Givens.) Leonard later penned the short story "Fire in the Hole", which became the basis for the television series Justified starring Timothy Olyphant. In April 2011, Leonard revealed in an interview that the success of Justified had inspired him to begin work on a new novel about the character. The novel, titled Raylan, came out in 2012, and was Leonard's last work to be published before his death.

Creation
Author Elmore Leonard has stated names are important in the creation of his characters. For Raylan Givens, it was an introduction at a lunch during a book distributor convention which provided the character's name.

Overview

In the novel Pronto, Givens is described as about forty years old, thin and rangy, and perpetually wearing a cowboy hat.  He is a native of Harlan County, Kentucky. Raylan likes ice cream as mentioned on Justified. He has an intuition about people and their criminal intentions which usually leads to him shooting them despite his best efforts to resolve things peacefully. While Raylan mostly attempts to act righteously, he has cornered certain adversaries with every intention to kill them. This is the very thing that lands Raylan back in Harlan at the start of season one of Justified.  In the novels, his hat is described as a flat-brimmed hat akin to the kind worn by the police officers in the photo of Lee Harvey Oswald's murder. According to the novel Pronto, before he became a Deputy Marshal, Givens served in the Marines.  After being given the slip by a federal grand jury witness, Harry Arno, at Atlanta Airport, Givens was appointed as a Firearms instructor at the U.S. Marshals Service Basic Training Academy in Glynco, Georgia. Givens, who was an expert marksman with a handgun and an expert at the fast draw  with any pistol as well as an expert with other weaponry, perceived this appointment as a demotion or reprimand for losing his witness.

Raylan uses several handguns throughout his appearances. In the novel Pronto, Raylan carries a Colt Python revolver with a 6-inch barrel, which fits his "cowboy" personality. On the show Justified, Raylan carries a SIG Sauer P226 for the shooting of Tommy Bucks, which he draws faster despite Bucks using the faster-drawing Glock 19. Raylan carries a small customized Colt Officers ACP .45 Handgun during his first case in Harlan and uses this to shoot Boyd Crowder. He then upgrades to a ".45 Glock" (presumably meaning a Glock 21 but the actual pistol shown is a 9mm Glock 17).

Adaptations
Raylan Givens was first portrayed by actor James LeGros in a 1997 television adaptation of Pronto. In early 2010, the FX Network premiered the television show Justified starring Timothy Olyphant in the role of Givens.

On the official Elmore Leonard website, some trepidation was expressed about the television show getting the correct hat for the character.

While the show Justified does not get the hat exactly correct, Leonard considers the show's portrayal of Givens to be perfect.

Givens is native to the rural eastern Kentucky mining area of Harlan County but is assigned to Miami Beach, Florida in the novels Pronto and Riding the Rap. For the short story "Fire in the Hole", Leonard has Givens returning to his roots and being assigned to Kentucky as a punishment for his actions in the previous novels.

List of literary appearances
Pronto (1993)
Riding the Rap (1995)
Fire in the Hole (2001)
Raylan (2012)

References

External links
 Elmore Leonard's Official website
 
 

Justified (TV series)
Fictional American police officers
Fictional government agents
Fictional gunfighters
Fictional vigilantes
Fictional characters from Kentucky
Drama television characters
Characters in American novels of the 20th century
Literary characters introduced in 1993
Fictional hapkido practitioners
Fictional Muay Thai practitioners
Fictional detectives
Fictional United States Marine Corps personnel
Western (genre) peace officers